Lubiatów  is a village in the administrative district of Gmina Drezdenko, within Strzelce-Drezdenko County, Lubusz Voivodeship, in western Poland.

The village has a population of 160. Located near to the village is the Lubiatów-Międzychód-Grotów oil field.

References

Villages in Strzelce-Drezdenko County